= Van Carey =

American mechanical engineer

Van P. Carey is an American mechanical engineer. He held the A. Richard Newton Chair in Engineering at the University of California, Berkeley. In 2014, the American Institute of Aeronautics and Astronautics awarded Carey its Thermophysics Award.
